Elachista averta is a moth of the family Elachistidae. It is found in Australia in eastern New South Wales and Queensland.

The wingspan is 9.3–9.9 mm for males. The colour of the forewings varies from creamy white to pale brownish grey. The hindwings are pale grey.

References

Moths described in 2011
averta
Moths of Australia
Taxa named by Lauri Kaila